Ángel María Gianola (3 October 1926 – 31 March 2022) was a Uruguayan lawyer and politician. A member of the National Party, he served as Minister of Industry and Work from 1960 to 1963 and Minister of the Interior from 1994 to 1995. He died in Montevideo on 31 March 2022, at the age of 95.

References

1926 births
2022 deaths
National Party (Uruguay) politicians
Ministers of Labor and Social Affairs of Uruguay
Interior ministers of Uruguay
Members of the Senate of Uruguay
20th-century Uruguayan lawyers
University of the Republic (Uruguay) alumni
Uruguayan people of Italian descent
People from Lavalleja Department
Knights Grand Cross of the Order of Isabella the Catholic
20th-century Uruguayan politicians